Provident is one of the 35 constituencies in the Eastern District, Hong Kong.

The constituency returns one district councillor to the Eastern District Council, with an election every four years. The seat is currently held by Kwok Wai-keung of the Hong Kong Federation of Trade Unions since the 2007 election.

Provident constituency is loosely based on the areas around Provident Centre and Wharf Road in North Point with estimated population of 20,643.

Councillors represented

Election results

2010s

2000s

1990s

References

North Point
Constituencies of Hong Kong
Constituencies of Eastern District Council
1994 establishments in Hong Kong
Constituencies established in 1994